Cooter's Place, also known simply as Cooter's, is the collective name of three museums in the United States, exhibiting memorabilia from the American action comedy TV series The Dukes of Hazzard. The museums are named after Cooter Davenport, one of the main characters in the show.

The museums are "operated by none other than ol’ Cooter himself;" that is, Ben Jones.

Cooter Davenport 

Cooter Davenport, the museum's namesake, is the mechanic of Hazzard County, where the show takes place. At the start of the first season, he is depicted as having an extremely rowdy personality; he disregards the law frequently. This has earned him the CB handle (nickname) "Crazy Cooter".

However, Cooter manages to tone down his wildness by the end of the first season, becoming more easy-going. He owns a garage across from the Hazzard County Sheriffs' Department called "Cooter's Garage".

The museums

Gatlinburg, TN 
Despite being officially known as "Cooter's (Place in) Gatlinburg", this location is actually in the neighboring town of Pigeon Forge.

In addition to the museum and shop, this location contains a mini-golf course and go-karts. This is where Cooter's Dodge Charger, known as General Lee (car), is exhibited.

Luray, VA 
The Luray location of Cooter's features Daisy's Diner (Daisy Duke is Bo, Luke, Coy, and Vance's attractive cousin on The Dukes of Hazzard), Cooter's tow truck ("the wrecker"), and Cooter's garage with another General Lee, all of which are regular occurrences on the show.

Nashville, TN 
The Nashville location of Cooter's features Cooter's tow truck ("the wrecker"), Daisy's Jeep, Rosco's patrol car, and yet another General Lee.

References

External links 
 Entry for Cooter's Place on the city website for Gatlinburg, TN
 Official website

Tourist attractions in Page County, Virginia
Tourist attractions in Nashville, Tennessee
Tourist attractions in Sevier County, Tennessee
Mass media museums in the United States
The Dukes of Hazzard